The Away Team is a hip hop duo consisting of MC Sean Boog and producer Khrysis, both of whom are members of the North Carolina rap collective the Justus League.

History

Boog and Khrysis were introduced to each other in 2001 by Little Brother's 9th Wonder, and became members of the Justus League collective as well as working together as The Away team. Boog had previously contributed to The Foreign Exchange’s debut album, Connected and the Justus League’s mixtape NC State Of Mind, while Khrysis had undertaken production work for Jean Grae, Big Pooh, and Masta Ace. Their debut album, The National Anthem, was released in May 2005 on 6 Hole Records, and featured guest appearances from Joe Scudda, Chaundon, Smif-n-Wessun, and Little Brother's Big Pooh and Phonte. It was described by ALARM magazine as "a combination of consistent rhymes and better than stellar production". Second album Training Day was released in 2007 on the Hall of Justus label, featuring contributions from unofficial third member Nervous Reck, Evidence (of Dilated Peoples), Sean Price, Black Milk, Supastition and Darien Brockington. The duo also contributed two tracks to the Hall of Justus album Soldiers of Fortune.

Discography
National Anthem (2005) - 6 Hole
Training Day (2007) - Hall of Justus
The Warm Up (2009) - Hall of Justus
Independence Day (2010) - IWWMG/The Academy
Scars & Stripes (2011) - IWWMG/Jamla/Duck Down
Grand Gesture (2013) - Jamla

References

External links
"The National Anthem Review", okayplayer
Jones, Kevin 92005) "Away Team National Anthem", Exclaim!
Doggett, Tom (2005) "Away Team :: National Anthem :: 6 Hole Records", RapReviews
Paine, Jake (2007) "The Away Team - Training Day", Hip Hop DX

Southern hip hop groups
American hip hop groups
American musical duos
Hip hop duos